Thomas Arnold (1878–unknown) was an English footballer who played in the Football League for Arsenal.

References

1878 births
English footballers
Association football forwards
English Football League players
Coventry City F.C. players
Arsenal F.C. players
Year of death missing